Lancelot Guy Michael Hannen MC (20 August 1924 - 11 April 2015) was a British Army officer of the Second World War who won the Military Cross for his part in holding Pidéura, Italy, in 1944 despite fierce German attacks. The citation noted Hannen's courage, leadership and endurance.

Hannen was educated at Eton College, the son of Lancelot Hannen CBE, senior partner at auction house Christie's.

After leaving the Army in 1947, Hannen followed in the family footsteps by joining Christie's, where he rose to be managing director.

References 

1924 births
2015 deaths
9th Queen's Royal Lancers officers
British Army personnel of World War II
Military personnel from London
Recipients of the Military Cross
People educated at Eton College
Christie's people